The Wire that Fenced the West is a book written by Henry D. and Frances T. McCallum and published in 1965 by the University of Oklahoma Press.

The book covers the history of the development of barbed wire and the inventors. It also include chapters of how it was marketed and the history of its use in the American West. It includes an illustrated identification guide showing the various brands, styles, and patents.

About the Authors 
Henry D. McCallum and his wife Frances T. McCallum wrote the book based on the hobby of Henry D. McCallum. McCallum started his collection when he was an oil geologist. When he would inspect in fields, he would notice the fences and recognize the variety of fence styles. He took home a sample and from there his collection grew to a massive size with more than a hundred different kinds of barbed wire.

Chapters
I. Barbed-Wire Fence-Makers
1. Threshold of Promise
2. Prelude to 1874
3. Incident at De Kalb
4. "Prior-Use" Fences
5. Promoting Barbed Wire
6. Moonshine and Monopoly
7. Patent Litigation
8. Barbed-Wire Barons
II. Barbed-Wire Fence-Builders
9. "This Cockeyed World of Cattle Fold"
10. "The Big Die-up"
11. "King of the Coasters" and Brother Jon
12. "Startin' in to Play H--- with Texas"
13. "Improvements" on the Public Domain
14. "Trail to Rail"
15. "Alambre! Alambre! Alambre!"
16. A Nineteenth-Century Allegory
III. Types of Barbed Wire
17. Modern Trends
18. Classification
19. Identification

Reception 
The book is one of a narrative monologue that is accredited with exceptional writing and regarded as an excellent reading. Some historians find that the work is not reliable for a reading of exact history. This is due to the secondary sources the author uses instead of any primary sources, and it is mentioned those used are not sufficient enough. Some critiques of the book find that McCallum used some credible sources such as court records, manuscript records of wire companies, family papers, and memoirs of leading figures of the field. The book lacks key elements of discussion such as enclosure practices and fencing laws, as well as economic and social responses and results to the barbed wire. Another issue a critic had was the lack of talk between barbed wire fences and the railroad industry.

Editions
Norman: University of Oklahoma Press, 1965. LC: 65-11234.

References

1965 non-fiction books
History books about the American Old West
University of Oklahoma Press books